The Grand and General Council is the parliament of San Marino. The council has 60 members elected for a five-year term.

History 

From the fifth century San Marino was ruled by an assembly composed by all the family heads known as the Arengo. However, as population grew, such a body became more and more dysfunctional, with its functioning being crippled by feuds between families.

While the exact timing is unknown, there is historical evidence that by the early 13th century the citizens of San Marino elected an assembly called Council of the LX, which was also known as the Grand and General Council. In this first stage the power was shared between the Arengo and the Council, with the latter gaining more and more power over the centuries. This process culminated in the 1600 statutes which defined the Council as the "supreme, absolute and unique prince of the community" attributing to it "the right over life, death and goods of every citizen" together with every power needed to rule and manage the country.

Until the 17th century, members of the Council were periodically elected by the Arengo, then the 1600 Statutes established that the Council could autonomously nominate its members by co-optation. This led to an increasing concentration of power in the hand of the richest families, which were also the only ones that could afford to pay for the necessary education. The oligarchic nature of the council became even clearer when, between the 17th and 18th centuries, laws were passed to formally establish a noble class with 20 seats reserved to it.

This situation ended on 25 March 1906 when the Arengo was summoned once again after centuries and in which householders were asked whether the system of co-option of councillors for life should continue. The proposal was rejected by 90.65% of voters, consequently, the country's first modern election was conducted on June 10, 1906.

During the fascism period, between 1923 and 1943, the Grand and General Council was dissolved and a new legislature called the Prince and Sovereign Council (Italian: Consiglio Principe e Sovrano) was formed, with all its 60 members belonging to the Sammarinese Fascist Party.

Suffrage was extended to women in 1959, granting to them the possibility to vote for the first time in the 1964 elections.

Electoral system 
The country's electoral law is based on the electoral system of Italian municipalities. Between 1945 and 2007, San Marino used proportional representation. A majority of at least 35 seats is given to the winning coalition of parties which receives an absolute majority of votes at the first or the eventual second round of elections. Within single coalitions, seats are divided between the parties using a D'Hondt system. A 3.5% threshold exists, together with guarantees for female candidates.

Powers 
The Council appoints from among its members the Congress of State, which is the executive branch of the government, and the Captains Regents, who serve as the heads of state.

Electoral results

In the 2019 election, two electoral alliances were formed:
Libera, an alliance of the Democratic Socialist Left, Civic 10 and Socialist Ideals Movement and Reforms and Development
Noi per la Repubblica, an alliance of the Socialist Party, Party of Socialists and Democrats, Democratic Movement San Marino Together and We Sammarinese

See also

Arengo
Politics of San Marino
List of legislatures by country

References

External links
 

 
13th-century establishments in Italy
San Marino
Government of San Marino
San Marino
San Marino
Politics of San Marino
Political organizations based in San Marino